A hoop is an apparatus in rhythmic gymnastics and may be made of plastic or wood, provided that it retains its shape during the routine. The hoop may be of a natural colour or be partially of fully covered by one or several colours, and it may be covered with adhesive tape either of the same or different colour as the hoop.

Fundamental requirements of a hoop routine include rotation around the hand or body and rolling, as well as swings, circles, throws, and passes through and over the hoop.

Many of the techniques of rhythmic gymnastics have been adopted by the modern hooping community.

External links
 

Hoop